Hugh Clarke Mixon (December 6, 1899 – February 10, 1976) was a treasurer of Lee County, Arkansas. He attended Vanderbilt University and Stanford University. At the former, he was a member of Dan McGugin's football teams.

References

External links
 

1899 births
1976 deaths
American football halfbacks
People from Marianna, Arkansas
Vanderbilt Commodores football players
Players of American football from Arkansas